Scenic Mississippi Regional Transit or SMRT is a commuter bus system serving the Driftless Area of Wisconsin. It provides four routes which serve Crawford County, La Crosse County, Monroe County and Vernon County. It was recognized by Wisconsin Rural Partners as one of Wisconsin’s Top Rural Development Initiatives in 2017.

Services
The transit system operates four routes. Each route runs 3 times per day, except the yellow route, which operates 4 times per day. There is no service on weekends.The routes are as follows:
Blue Route: La Crosse - Viroqua
Green Route: La Crosse - Tomah
Red Route: La Crosse - Prairie du Chien
Yellow Route: La Crosse - Viroqua

In 2017, a study was conducted on providing service to Arcadia, however, no service has begun. Service to Cashton was proposed in the 2021 La Crosse Regional Transit Development Plan.

Communities Served
Crawford County
De Soto
Ferryville
Lynxville
Prairie du Chien
La Crosse County
La Crosse
West Salem
Monroe County
Sparta
Tomah
Vernon County
Coon Valley
Genoa
Stoddard
Viroqua
Westby

Ridership

See also
 La Crosse Municipal Transit Utility
 List of intercity bus stops in Wisconsin
 List of bus transit systems in the United States

References

External links
https://ridesmrt.com/

La Crosse, Wisconsin
Bus transportation in Wisconsin